Jelgava Local Municipality is a municipality in Zemgale, Latvia. The municipality was formed in 2009 by merging Eleja parish, Glūda parish, Jaunsvirlauka parish, Lielplatone parish, Līvbērze parish, Platone parish, Sesava parish, Svēte parish, Valgunde parish, Vilce parish, Vircava parish, Zaļenieki parish and Kalnciems town with its countryside territory the administrative centre located in Jelgava city, which is not included in the territory of municipality. As of 2020, the population was 21,738.

On 1 July 2021, Jelgava Municipality was enlarged when Ozolnieki Municipality were merged into it.

Twin towns — sister cities

Jelgava Local Municipality is twinned with:

 Alytus, Lithuania
 Argeș County, Romania
 Baena, Spain
 Glodeni District, Moldova
 Grodno District, Belarus
 Joniškis, Lithuania
 Recklinghausen, Germany
 Slawharad, Belarus
 Suwałki, Poland
 Trivero, Italy

Images

See also
Administrative divisions of Latvia

References

External links

 
Municipalities of Latvia
Semigallia